To Paris with Love is a 1955 British comedy film directed by Robert Hamer and starring Alec Guinness, Odile Versois and Vernon Gray.

Premise
A father and son play matchmaker for each other during a trip to Paris.

Cast
Alec Guinness as Col. Sir Edgar Fraser
Odile Versois as Lizette Marconne
Vernon Gray as John Fraser
Elina Labourdette as Sylvia Gilbert
Jacques François as Victor de Colville
Austin Trevor as Leon de Colville
Jacques Brunius as Aristide Marconnet
Claude Romain as Georges Duprez	
Maureen Davis as Suzanne de Colville	
Mollie Hartley Milburn as Madame Alvarez
Michael Anthony as Pierre	
Pamela Stirling as Madame Marconnet	
Claude Collier as Solo Drummer, Cabaret Act	
George Lafaye Company as Cabaret Act

Production
Though the release prints received the credit 'Color by Technicolor', the production was filmed on location in Eastmancolor and at Pinewood Studios in 3-strip Technicolor. This was at a time when the photographing of British films in colour was moving from 3-strip Technicolor to Eastmancolor. Such films are considered hybrids, another being The Purple Plain, made by the same production company the previous year.

Reception

Critical reception
In a contemporary review, The New York Times wrote, "the screen play by Robert Buckner about a Scottish gentleman and his son who visit Paris and have mild infatuations, the son with an older woman and the father with a girl, is an obvious and strained stab at humor, almost empty of wit or irony. And the performance of Mr. Guinness in it is perhaps the most pallid and listless he has ever turned in. These are hard words to utter about Mr. Guinness and one of his films, but the lack of his customary vigor is so evident that the words cannot be withheld. Except for occasional moments, when Mr. Guinness takes sudden spurts at farce—such as getting his suspenders caught in a hotel-room door or finding himself entangled in a badminton net—he walks through his slight romantic pretense as though he were either ill or bored. His director, Robert Hamer, must share the responsibility, too, for the pace and invention in creation are conspicuously slow and undefined".<ref>{{cite web|url=https://www.nytimes.com/movie/reviewres=9D02E4DA153EE53ABC4151DFB566838E649EDE|title=Movie Review - Screen: Pallid Guinness;  To Paris With Love' Opens at Fine Arts - NYTimes.com|website=www.nytimes.com}}</ref>

More recently, the Radio Times applauded the film as "An amiable, light-hearted exercise in postwar "naughtiness"...enlivened by Guinness's engaging performance, reunited as he is with his Kind Hearts and Coronets'' director Robert Hamer, and a screenplay of sweet charm from Warner Bros veteran Robert Buckner. Both the leading lady, lovely Odile Versois, and Paris itself are delightful in mid-1950s Technicolor, and this movie, though slight, is often shamefully underrated."

Box Office
Walter Reade paid Rank a guarantee of $400,000 for the film which was considered high.

The film earned $700,000 in the US, a strong figure for a British movie at the time.

References

External links
 
 

1955 films
Films directed by Robert Hamer
Films shot at Pinewood Studios
British comedy films
1955 comedy films
1950s English-language films
1950s British films